was a city located in Yamaguchi Prefecture, Japan.

On April 21, 2003, Tokuyama, along with the city of Shinnan'yō, the town of Kumage (from Kumage District), and the town of Kano (from Tsuno District), was merged to create the city of Shūnan.

The city had a population of about 150,000 people. Its location along the Sanyō Shinkansen made for easy access to nearby cities such as Hiroshima and Fukuoka. Hikari holds a sizable beach.

Education

The city previously had a North Korean school, Tokuyama Korean Elementary and Junior High School (徳山朝鮮初中級学校).

References

External links
  (Archive)
Shūnan official website 

Dissolved municipalities of Yamaguchi Prefecture
Populated places established in 1944
Populated places disestablished in 2003
Shūnan, Yamaguchi